Bryan Sutton is an American musician. Primarily known as a flatpicking acoustic guitar player, Sutton also plays mandolin, banjo, ukulele, and electric guitar. He also sings and writes songs.

Biography

Early career
Sutton's grandfather and father were regionally recognized fiddlers, and Sutton grew up playing in the family band, the Pisgah Pickers. In 1991, he played guitar for Karen Peck and New River, a gospel group. In 1993, he moved to Nashville.

Ricky Skaggs
Sutton first came to prominence in 1997 as lead guitarist in Ricky Skaggs' band Kentucky Thunder when Skaggs returned to bluegrass. Sutton eventually left the band to focus on session work.

Hot Rize

Bryan was asked to join the bluegrass quartet Hot Rize in 2002. He has toured and recorded with them ever since, and has only missed one show since they re-formed.

Session work and touring
In addition to Skaggs and Hot Rize, Sutton has toured with the Dixie Chicks, Jerry Douglas, Sam Bush, Béla Fleck, Hot Rize, Chris Thile, Tony Rice and others.

In 2007-08, Sutton toured with Chris Thile & The How to Grow a Band, a project which later turned into the Punch Brothers.

Bryan is one of the most in-demand session players in Nashville, and recently produced a record for Della Mae and the Cash Cabin. His style is a unique blend of staccato mixed with powerful chromatic and melodic movements which is integrated into the more common bluegrass, blues and folk leads that are common to the genre.

Other projects
In June, 2011 he launched the Online Bluegrass Guitar School with Bryan Sutton, as part of the ArtistWorks Academy of Bluegrass.

In 2013, Sutton recorded the album Ready for the Times with T. Michael Coleman and David Holt. They recorded the album as a tribute to Doc Watson. The trio got together in 2011, and have performed frequently under the name Deep River Rising.

Recordings
For Almost Live, Sutton was joined by 17 guest musicians, including Béla Fleck (banjo), Jerry Douglas (resonator guitar), Russ Barenberg (guitar), Chris Thile (mandolin), and Stuart Duncan (fiddle).

Sutton's album Into My Own featured guests Bill Frisell (guitar), Ronnie McCoury (mandolin), and Noam Pikelny (banjo).

On 2016's The More I Learn, Sutton continued to develop and showcase his singing and songwriting skills. The album prominently features Bryan Sutton Band members Casey Campbell (mandolin), Mike Barnett (fiddle), and Sam Grisman (bass).

Awards
2000 - IBMA Guitar Player of the Year
2003 - IBMA Guitar Player of the Year
2004 - IBMA Guitar Player of the Year
2005 - IBMA Guitar Player of the Year
2006 - IBMA Guitar Player of the Year
2007 - Grammy Award for Best Country Instrumental Performance for Whiskey Before Breakfast w/ Doc Watson. The song was recorded using 3 vintage Neumann microphones and a laptop in a Colorado hotel room by Engineer Phil Harris.
2011 - IBMA Guitar Player of the Year 
2013 - IBMA Guitar Player of the Year
2014 - IBMA Guitar Player of the Year
2014 - Into My Own was nominated for a Grammy in the Best Bluegrass Album category
2015 - IBMA Guitar Player of the Year
2016 - IBMA Guitar Player of the Year

Gear
Bryan supports Bourgeois Guitars and performs regularly with his own signature model, a Bourgeois Bryan Sutton Limited Edition.  He also uses a Bourgeois "Country Boy Deluxe" model dreadnought, and a Bourgeois "Banjo Killer" slope-shouldered dreadnought, which is another model directly inspired by Bryan. He also regularly performs with a 1940 Martin D-28.

Discography

References

External links
BryanSutton.com, Official site
 
 
Bryan Sutton Interview
Online Bluegrass Guitar School with Bryan Sutton

Bluegrass musicians from North Carolina
American country guitarists
American country singer-songwriters
Grammy Award winners
Living people
American mandolinists
Resonator guitarists
American country banjoists
1973 births
American acoustic guitarists
American male guitarists
American bluegrass mandolinists
Musicians from Asheville, North Carolina
Guitarists from North Carolina
American session musicians
20th-century American guitarists
21st-century American male singers
21st-century American singers
Country musicians from North Carolina
21st-century American guitarists
Punch Brothers members
Hot Rize members
Kentucky Thunder members
American male singer-songwriters
Singer-songwriters from North Carolina